The 2016 CONCACAF Women's U-17 Championship was the 5th edition of the CONCACAF Women's U-17 Championship, the biennial international youth football championship organised by CONCACAF for the women's under-17 national teams of the North, Central American and Caribbean region. The tournament was hosted by Grenada and take place between 3–13 March 2016, as announced by CONCACAF on 15 May 2015. A total of eight teams will play in the tournament.

Same as previous editions, the tournament acted as the CONCACAF qualifiers for the FIFA U-17 Women's World Cup. The top three teams of the tournament qualified for the 2016 FIFA U-17 Women's World Cup in Jordan as the CONCACAF representatives.

The United States won their third title overall with a 2–1 final victory over Mexico. Both finalists and third-placed Canada qualified for the World Cup.

Qualification

The eight berths were allocated to the three regional zones as follows:
Three teams from the North American Zone (NAFU), i.e., Canada, Mexico and the United States, who all qualified automatically
Two teams from the Central American Zone (UNCAF)
Three teams from the Caribbean Zone (CFU), including Grenada who qualified automatically as hosts

Regional qualification tournaments were held to determine the four teams joining Canada, Mexico, the United States, and hosts Grenada at the final tournament.

Qualified teams
The following eight teams qualified for the final tournament.

Venues
The tournament was hosted in St. George's. The Grenada Athletic Stadium hosted the matches for Group A, as well as the semifinals, third place match and the final, while the Grenada National Stadium hosted the matches for Group B.

Draw
The draw for the tournament took place on 21 January 2016 at 11:00 AST (UTC−4) at the Radisson Grenada Beach Resort Hotel in St. George's.

The eight teams were drawn into two groups of four teams. Tournament host Grenada were seeded in Group A, while defending CONCACAF Women's U-17 Championship champion Mexico were seeded in Group B.

Squads

Players born on or after 1 January 1999 were eligible to compete in the tournament. Each team could register a maximum of 20 players (two of whom must be goalkeepers).

Group stage
The top two teams of each group advanced to the semi-finals. The teams were ranked according to points (3 points for a win, 1 point for a draw, 0 points for a loss). If tied on points, tiebreakers would be applied in the following order:
Goal difference in all group matches;
Greatest number of goals scored in all group matches;
Greatest number of points obtained in the group matches between the teams concerned;
Goal difference resulting from the group matches between the teams concerned;
Greater number of goals scored in all group matches between the teams concerned;
Drawing of lots.

All times were local, AST (UTC−4).

Group A

Group B

Knockout stage
In the knockout stage, penalty shoot-out would be used to decide the winner if necessary (no extra time would be played).

Bracket

Semi-finals
Winners qualified for 2016 FIFA U-17 Women's World Cup.

Third place playoff
Winner qualified for 2016 FIFA U-17 Women's World Cup.

Final

Winners

Qualified teams for FIFA U-17 Women's World Cup
The following three teams from CONCACAF qualified for the FIFA U-17 Women's World Cup.

1 Bold indicates champion for that year. Italic indicates host for that year.

Goalscorers
7 goals
 Nérilia Mondésir

5 goals

 Mikerline Saint-Félix
 Frankie Tagliaferri
 Ashley Sanchez

4 goals
 Civana Kuhlmann

3 goals

 Teni Akindoju
 Melissa Dacius

2 goals

 Jordyn Huitema
 Vital Kats
 Lauren Raimondo
 Sarah Stratigakis
 Gloriana Villalobos
 María Herrarte
 Yuvitza Mayén
 Niurka Oliva
 Lovelie Pierre
 Dayana Cazares
 Daniela Espinosa
 Montserrat Hernández
 Lizbeth Ovalle
 Alexa Spaanstra

1 goal

 Nahida Baalbaki
 Kennedy Faulknor
 Shana Flynn
 Jayde Riviere
 Merilyn Alvarado
 Valeria del Campo
 María Paula Salas
 Didra Martínez
 Adriana Ordóñez
 Melchie Dumonay
 Roseline Éloissaint
 Martine Olivier
 Ebony Clarke
 Tarania Clarke
 Shayla Smart
 Maricarmen Reyes
 Jordan Canniff
 Sophia Smith

Own goal
 Resheda Charles (playing against Guatemala)

Awards
The following awards were given at the conclusion of the tournament.

Best XI
Goalkeeper:  Laurel Ivory
Right Defender:  Kennedy Wesley
Central Defender:  Naomi Girma
Central Defender:  Kimberly Rodríguez
Left Defender:  Julia Grosso
Right Midfielder:  Nérilia Mondésir
Central Midfielder:  Brianna Pinto
Central Midfielder:  Jaelin Howell
Left Midfielder:  Lizbeth Ovalle
Forward:  Ashley Sanchez
Forward:  Civana Kuhlmann

References

External links
Under 17s – Women, CONCACAF.com

 
2016
Women's U-17 Championship
2016 in women's association football
2016 CONCACAF Women's U-17 Championship
2016 in youth association football